This is a list of roads designated A3. Roads entries are sorted in the countries alphabetical order.

 A003 road (Argentina), a road connecting the junction with National Route 9 and Camino de Cintura to Tigre
 A3 road (Australia) may refer to :
 A3 (Sydney), a road connecting the Sydney's Northern Beaches to Sydney's Southern suburbs
 A3 road (South Australia), a road connecting Plympton, Adelaide and Glen Osmond, Adelaide
 A3 road (Tasmania), a road connecting Hobart and Launceston
 Burnett Highway, Queensland
 D'Aguilar Highway, Queensland
 Gympie Road, Brisbane, Queensland
 New England Highway, Queensland
 A3 motorway (Austria), a road connecting Knoten Guntramsdorf and Ebreichsdorf
 A3 motorway (Belgium), a road connecting Brussel and Liège
 A3 motorway (Bulgaria), a road connecting Sofia (via A6) and the border crossing to Greece, at the village of Kulata
 A3 highway (Botswana), connecting Francistown and Maun
 A3 motorway (Croatia), a road connecting the border crossings with Slovenia and Serbia and passing through Zagreb
 A3 motorway (Cuba), a road connecting Havana and Melena del Sur
 A3 motorway (Cyprus), a road connecting Larnaca and Ayia Napa
 A3 motorway (France), a road connecting Montreuil-sous-Bois, Rosny-sous-Bois and Bondy
 A3 motorway (Germany), a road connecting Wesel and Passau
A3 motorway (Greece), a road connecting Lamia and Grevena
 A3 motorway (Italy), a road connecting Naples and the Reggio Calabria
 A3 road (Jamaica), a road connecting Kingston and Saint Ann's Bay 
 A3 highway (Kazakhstan), a road connecting Almaty to Oskemen
 A3 road (Kenya), a road connecting to Liboi at the Somali border
 A3 road (Latvia), a road connecting Inčukalns and the Estonian border in Valka
 A3 highway (Lesotho), a road connecting Mantsonyane and Thaba-Tseka
 A3 highway (Lithuania), a road connecting Vilnius and Minskas
 A3 motorway (Luxembourg), a road connecting Luxembourg City to Dudelange
 A3 road (Malaysia), a road in Sabah
 A3 motorway (Morocco), a road connecting Casablanca and Rabat
 A3 highway (Nigeria), a road connecting Port Harcourt to the Republic of Cameroon at north-east Nigeria
 A3 road (People's Republic of China) may refer to :
 A3 expressway (Shanghai), the former name of the S3 expressway, a planned expressway in Shanghai
 A3 autostrada (Poland), a formerly planned motorway in western Poland
 A3 motorway (Portugal), a road connecting Porto and Braga
 A3 motorway (Romania), a road planned to connect when fully constructed Bucharest to the western border near Oradea
 A3 motorway (Serbia), a road connecting Belgrade and Croatian border
 A3 motorway (Slovenia), a road connecting Gabrk and Fernetiči at the Italian border
 A3 road (Spain) may refer to :
 A-3 motorway (Spain), a road connecting Madrid and Valencia
 A3 motorway (Extremadura), a road connecting Zafra and Jerez de los Caballeros
 A3 motorway (Switzerland), a road connecting Basel and Sargans
 A 3 road (Sri Lanka), a road connecting Peliyagoda and Puttalam 
 A3 motorway (Tunisia), a road connecting Tunis and Oued Zarga
 A3 road (United Kingdom) may refer to :
 A3 road (Great Britain), a road connecting London and Portsmouth
 A3 road (Isle of Man), a road connecting Castletown and Ramsey
 A3 road (Northern Ireland), a road connecting Lisburn and Middletown
 A3 road (United States of America) may refer to :
 Interstate A-3, a road connecting Anchorage and Soldotna
 County Route A3, a road connecting Standish and Buntingville
 A3 road (Zimbabwe), a road connecting Manicatown and Harare via Chitungwiza

See also
 List of highways numbered 3